Leachkin (from the  , "The Broad Hillside") is a suburb on the western outskirts of Inverness, in the Highland council area of Scotland. It is about 3 km west of the city centre, on the hill sloping towards Craig Dunain and Craig Phadrig.

New Craigs Psychiatric Hospital is in Leachkin, it replaced Craig Dunain Hospital and Craig Phadrig Hospital which were nearby. Great Glen House—the headquarters of Scottish Natural Heritage—is also in the area.

References

Areas of Inverness